Moroni may refer to:

Moroni (name)
House of Moroni, an Italian noble family
Moroni, Comoros
Moroni, Utah
Moroni (Book of Mormon prophet), a prophet in the Book of Mormon
Angel Moroni, the angel that Joseph Smith claimed visited him
Book of Moroni, a book of the Book of Mormon
Captain Moroni, a figure in the Book of Mormon
Moroni (footballer) (born 1961), Brazilian footballer